is a Japanese voice actor who works for Haikyo.

Notable voice roles

Anime
Lance in 07 Ghost 
Brindo and young Hody Jones in One Piece
Check Mate and Ilioukhine in Kinnikuman Nisei (Ultimate Muscle)
Arizona Governor in Eureka Seven Ao
Yu Himura in Ef: A Fairy Tale of the Two
En Daidouji in Brave Command Dagwon
Erigor in Fairy Tail
Griffin Minos in Saint Seiya
Go Hibiki in Mach Go Go
Groundman in Rockman.EXE Beast
Hawkmon in Digimon Adventure 02
Hayato Marikoji in Himawari!
Hawktor in Bakugan Battle Brawlers: Gundalian Invaders
Hazel Grouse in Saiyuki Reload Gunlock
Hazel Grouse in Saiyuki Reload: Zeroin
I'm Sorry Masked Man and Nightmare in Bobobo-bo Bo-bobo
Jenai in Chrono Crusade
Ken Amafuji in Boku wa Konomama Kaeranai
Kotaro Kakinouchi in The Mythical Detective Loki Ragnarok
Mirai in Mirmo!
Neji Hyuga in Naruto
Neji Hyuga in Naruto: Shippuden
Neji Hyuga in Naruto SD
Norio in Monster Rancher
Sentarō Kotsubaki in Bleach
Pawn in Weiß Kreuz
Peath Glinhouse in Back Arrow
Peta in Märchen Awakens Romance
Raiha in Flame of Recca
Rioroute Vilgyna in Candidate for Goddess
Ryō Shirogane in Tokyo Mew Mew
Ryu Amakusa in Detective Academy Q
Ryunosuke Kurumi in HeartCatch Pretty Cure!
Smart Ass in Who Framed Roger Rabbit
Sentaro Kotsubaki and Yylfordt Granz in Bleach
Shiba (younger) in Groove Adventure RAVE
Shinji Kume in He Is My Master
Taishi Kuhonbutsu in Comic Party
Tigatron/TigerFalcon in Beast Wars
Tommy Parsy, Mr. Dog, Coach, and Ruby Green in the Snowboard Kids series
Tsuyoshi Wabba in the Super Yo-Yo
Toyohiro Kanedaichi in JoJo's Bizarre Adventure: Diamond Is Unbreakable
Wei Fei Li in Ceres, Celestial Legend
Yokota in Uzumaki
Yōsui in Fushigi Yūgi OVA 2

Tōchika is also known for his role as the voice actor of Sumisu-san, スミスさん or "Mr Smith" on the audio CD of the textbook series Japanese For Busy People.

Anime Movies
Hawkmon in Digimon Adventure: Last Evolution Kizuna (2020)

Television (live-action/drama)
Mac Windy (Actor: Reuben Langdon)/B-Fighter Yanma in B-Fighter Kabuto
Dangoron in B-Robo KabutackSuction Force Pyma Beast Vampira (ep. 9) in Kyuukyuu Sentai GoGo FiveBowling Org (ep. 28) in Hyakujuu Sentai GaorangerThunder Ninja Unadaigo (ep. 24) in Ninpuu Sentai HurricangerTrinoid 18: Rakopiman (ep. 29) in Bakuryu Sentai AbarangerPukosian Jackil (ep. 31) in Tokusou Sentai DekarangerCommander Adolokuss in Genseishin JustiriserSavage Sky Barbaric Machine Beast Lenz Banki (ep. 9) in Engine Sentai Go-ongerSecret Lantern Daigoyou in (eps. 28 - 49)  Samurai Sentai ShinkengerSecret Lantern Daigoyou in Samurai Sentai Shinkenger vs. Go-onger: GinmakuBang!!Secret Lantern Daigoyou in Samurai Sentai Shinkenger ReturnsSecret Lantern Daigoyou in Tensou Sentai Goseiger vs. Shinkenger: Epic on GinmakuDrama CDsGaki no Ryoubun series 6: Manatsu no ZankyouMayonaka ni Oai Shimashou (Midori Kaidouji)Miscast series (Nanase Aikou)Ourin Gakuen series 1: Ikenai Seitokaishitsu (Fumitoshi Sakai)Ourin Gakuen series 2: Ai no Sainou (Fumitoshi Sakai)Yume wa Kirei ni Shidokenaku (Mamoru Ichinomiya)

DubbingAre You Afraid of the Dark? (Ross Hull)Das Boot, Bootsmann Lamprecht (Uwe Ochsenknecht)Joy Ride 2: Dead Ahead, Bobby Lawrence (Nick Zano)
Rocko's Modern Life, Rocko (Carlos Alazraqui)

Video games
2016–present Sonic the Hedgehog (series)'', Antoine

References

External links
 
Kouichi Tohchika at Ryu's Seiyuu Infos

Living people
Japanese male video game actors
Japanese male voice actors
20th-century Japanese male actors
21st-century Japanese male actors
Year of birth missing (living people)
Tokyo Actor's Consumer's Cooperative Society voice actors